Gaular is a former municipality in Sogn og Fjordane county, Norway. It was located in the traditional district of Sunnfjord. The administrative centre was the village of Sande. Other villages in the municipality included Bygstad, Hestad, and Vik. Gaular was sometimes referred to as Fosselandet (the land of the waterfalls) because it was home to 28 large and small waterfalls. The municipality was centered on the river Gaula. The Viksdalen valley was located in Gaular.

At the time of its dissolution in 2020, the  municipality is the 190th largest by area out of the 422 municipalities in Norway. Gaular is the 263rd most populous municipality in Norway with a population of 3,027.

In 2016, the chief of police for Vestlandet formally suggested a reconfiguration of police districts and stations. He proposed that the police station in Gaular be closed.

General information

The parish of Indre Holmedal was established as a municipality on 1 January 1838 (see formannskapsdistrikt law). The original municipality was identical to the Indre Holmedal parish (prestegjeld) which included the sub-parishes of Bygstad, Sande, and Vik. In 1912, the name of the municipality was changed to Gaular.  On 1 January 1990, parts of the Hestad area (west of Sunde-Klepp, west of Bygstad) were transferred from Fjaler to Gaular.

On 1 January 2020, the neighboring municipalities of Gaular, Førde, Naustdal, and Jølster were merged to form the new Sunnfjord Municipality.

Name
The name is derived from the name of the river Gaula. The old name of the area was revived in 1912, prior to that the name of the municipality was Indre Holmedal, meaning the inner part of Holmedal.

Coat of arms
The coat of arms was granted on 24 April 1992. The arms are green with a wavy silver line running straight up and down across the arms. It represents the river Gaula which passes through the forested municipality.

Churches
The Church of Norway had one parish within the municipality of Gaular. It was part of the Sunnfjord prosti (deanery) in the Diocese of Bjørgvin.

Government
All municipalities in Norway, including Gaular, are responsible for primary education (through 10th grade), outpatient health services, senior citizen services, unemployment and other social services, zoning, economic development, and municipal roads. The municipality is governed by a municipal council of elected representatives, which in turn elect a mayor.  The municipality falls under the Sogn og Fjordane District Court and the Gulating Court of Appeal.

Municipal council
The municipal council  of Gaular was made up of 21 representatives that were elected to four year terms. The party breakdown of the final municipal council was as follows:

Mayor
The mayor (ordførar) of a municipality in Norway is a representative of the majority party of the municipal council who is elected to lead the council. Mathias Råheim of the Conservative Party was elected mayor for the 2011–2015 term and he was re-elected to the 2015–2019 term as well.

Geography

Gaular is located in the central part of Vestland county, in the Sunnfjord region. It is bordered to the north by the municipalities of Askvoll and Førde, to the east by Balestrand, to the south by Høyanger, and to the west by Fjaler.

The Gaula River flows west through the municipality and empties into the Dalsfjorden near the village of Bygstad. There are several large lakes that are part of the river Gaula including the lakes Haukedalsvatnet and Viksdalsvatnet. The river begins in the Gaularfjellet mountains to the east of the municipality.

Transportation
The Norwegian County Road 13 runs through the eastern part of the municipality. Førde Airport, Bringeland (ENBL) is located at Bringelandsåsen in Gaular municipality.

Attractions

The Salmon Stairs
William T. Potts from Coreen Castle in Ireland initiated the building of the salmon stairs (a type of fish ladder), which were completed in 1871, in return for an agreement made with the farmers that had 25 years of free fishing. The salmon stairs at Osen in Bygstad are the oldest in the world. It is very effective as the salmon are forced to make their way up the stair construction, due to the current below the falls.

National Tourist Road
Fylkesvei 13 (Fv13) is one of 18 national tourist roads in Norway because of the nearby waterfalls. From near the town of Førde, drivers start on a sightseeing journey with cultural attractions that date from the 19th century to the present day's city environment. The districts of Holsen and Haukedalen are typical of Western Norwegian farming communities that have created a picturesque cultivated landscape.

Rørvik Mountain is on the road and it has fascinating stone walls and a marvellous view over the Haukedalen valley. Along Råheimsdalen and Eldalen to the Gaularfjellet mountains, you will see a marvellous waterfall landscape that has been landscaped with paths for visitors. From the top of Gaularfjellet mountains, hairpin bends wind down to the Vetlefjorden, an arm of the Sognefjorden. The breathtaking contrasts of steep mountainsides, winding roads, and waterfalls are characteristic of Western Norway's exceptional scenery.

See also
List of former municipalities of Norway

References

External links

Municipal fact sheet from Statistics Norway 

 
Sunnfjord
Former municipalities of Norway
1838 establishments in Norway
2020 disestablishments in Norway